Monte Hawley (? - November 30, 1950) was an African American actor from Chicago, Illinois.

Biography
He began his entertainment career as one of the original Lafayette Players. He studied under Richard B. Harrison and, after moving to New York City, acted in works on Broadway. He then moved to Hollywood and appeared in movies, including Oscar Micheaux's first film production. He was an actor in, and stage manager for, the original traveling production of the play Anna Lucasta. According to the Philadelphia Tribune, Hawley was considered one of the most prominent Black "stage and screen actors".

He was in several theatrical productions on Broadway.

Hawley died on November 30, 1950, in New York City.

Filmography

A Son of Satan (1924)
Life Goes On, as District Attorney 
The Duke Is Tops (1938), as George Marshall
Double Deal (1939), as Jim McCoy 
Reform School (1939), as Jackson
Four Shall Die (1940), as Dr. Hugh Leonard (credited as Monty Hawley) 
Mystery in Swing (1940), as Biff Boyd
Am I Guilty? (1940), as Tracy
Gang War (1940), as Bill
Lucky Ghost (1942), as Masher
Mr. Washington Goes to Town (1942), as Stiletto
Tall, Tan, and Terrific (1946), as "Handsome" Harry Hansom 
Mantan Messes Up (1946), as Monte
 What a Guy (1948)
Miracle in Harlem (1948), as Lieutenant Renard

References

1950 deaths
Harlem Renaissance
Male actors from Chicago
African-American actors
Year of birth missing